Hubs and nodes is a geographic model explaining how linked regions can co-operate to fulfill elements of an industry's value chain and collectively gain sufficient mass to drive innovation growth. The model of hubs and nodes builds on Porter's cluster model which served well in the past, but as businesses and regions around the world have adjusted to the realities of globalization, the concept of clusters is becoming outdated.

Disaggregation of clusters
Companies are realizing that they may not require a particular stage of production to be in close geographic proximity. As barriers to long-distance national and global transactions have fallen through advances in technology and logistics, such as the growth of the Internet and overnight package services, it has become increasingly possible to relocate operations such as research, product development, and manufacturing to countries and regions with relevant expertise and lower costs. It is common among consumer goods, for example, to have concept generation centered in one locale, product testing and refinement in another, and manufacturing and distribution in still others. Elements of development, production and distribution are being more and more completed beyond the borders of historical clusters. 

As more companies progress beyond the cluster model, they increasingly expand and diversify their operations to locations where their investments will be most profitable. For companies adequately prepared for the rapid globalization process, their research and development, manufacturing and distribution stages fare better as these businesses are able to reduce their costs and potentially realizing new efficiencies and increased speeds of product development. The spirit of the cluster model may remain intact, and the various stages of production will still be shared by a number of different entities, but geographical proximity need no longer bind the entities together

Economic geography